Shipowners' Liability (Sick and Injured Seamen) Convention, 1936 is an International Labour Organization Convention.

It was established in 1936, with the preamble stating:
Having decided upon the adoption of certain proposals with regard to the liability of the shipowner in case of sickness, injury or death of seamen,...

The Convention was ratified by the United States Senate and made effective by proclamation of the President on 29 October 1939, 54 Stat. 1963, 1704.  In Warren v. United States, 340 U.S. 523 (1951), the Supreme Court considered the application and interpretation of Article 2 of the Convention in a seaman's case against his employer, the United States, in its capacity as owner of the merchant ship S. S. Anna Howard Shaw.

While on shore leave, the seaman visited a dance hall.  An adjoining room overlooking the ocean had French doors that opened to an unprotected ledge.  The seaman stepped out onto the ledge, lost his balance, and fell.  He sued to recover maintenance and cure.

The district court awarded maintenance and cure and the Second Circuit Court of Appeals disallowed it.  Reversing, the Supreme Court noted:

"The Convention was a product of the International Labor Organization.  Its purpose was to provide an international system of regulation of the shipowner's liability.  That international system was aimed at providing a reasonable average which could be applied in any country. . . .  The aim indeed was not to change materially American standards but to equalize operating costs by raising the standards of member nations to the American level."

Ratifications
As of 2023, 18 states have ratified the convention. It has subsequently been denounced by 13 of those ratifying states.

External links
 Text.
 Ratifications.

International Labour Organization conventions
Treaties concluded in 1936
Treaties entered into force in 1939
Treaties of Belgium
Treaties of Belize
Treaties of Djibouti
Treaties of Egypt
Treaties of Italy
Treaties of Mexico
Treaties of Panama
Treaties of Peru
Treaties of Tunisia
Treaties of Turkey
Treaties of the United States
Admiralty law treaties
Liability treaties
Treaties extended to American Samoa
Treaties extended to Guam
Treaties extended to Puerto Rico
Treaties extended to the United States Virgin Islands
Occupational safety and health treaties
1936 in labor relations